General elections were held in Myanmar on 27 May 1990, the first multi-party elections since 1960, after which the country had been ruled by a military dictatorship. The elections were for a parliament-sized constitutional committee to draft a new constitution.

The result was a landslide victory for Aung San Suu Kyi's National League for Democracy (NLD), which won 392 of the 492 seats. However, the military junta refused to recognise the results and continued ruling the country until 2011. Voter turnout was 72.6%.

Background
The aftermath of the uprising in 1988 and the rise of leader Aung San Suu Kyi placed worldwide media attention on the political situation in Myanmar. In September 1988, the State Law and Order Restoration Council (SLORC, the predecessor to the State Peace and Development Council), in its Declaration No. 1, had set four goals for the country: to maintain law and order, improve transportation, improve the humanitarian situation and hold multi-party elections. It also stated that the military would not "cling to power for long". Aung San Suu Kyi had been calling for dialogue between the SLORC and the citizens of Myanmar. In May 1989, the government reopened universities that had been involved in the uprising the previous year. At the same time, the government conceded and a date for the election was set for May 1990 with political parties registering for the election immediately. The date, 27 May 1990, was chosen for its auspicious nature surrounding the number 9; 27 May (2+7=9), and on the fourth Sunday of the fifth month (4+5=9).

Parties and campaigning
93 political parties presented a total of 2,297 candidates to contest the 492 constituencies, with at least 2 candidates per constituency. Of the 93, 19 different ethnic parties also took part in the election. The National Unity Party (NUP) was favoured by the military to win. Aung San Suu Kyi, a popular opposition figure, ran against General Ne Win's largely disliked associate, Sein Lein. The symbol for the NUP was a sheaf of rice stalks, and the NLD's was a straw hat. Some people took to wearing rice stalks around their bare feet, a grave insult in a Buddhist country.

Although election campaigning was underway, the government placed restrictions on opposition politicians. U Aung Gyi, a former member of the junta, was expected to lead a weak coalition that would not challenge the interests of the army. He was imprisoned in 1988 for his outspoken views against the regime, but criticised Aung San Suu Kyi for being a "radical manipulated by Communists". Former Prime Minister U Nu remained under house arrest during the election process, as was Aung San Suu Kyi since 20 July 1989, without trial. Throughout campaigning, the government kept its restrictions on public gatherings and political meetings, and required all political literature to be approved by the SLORC prior to publication; however political parties defied the ruling. Two days before the election, visas for 61 foreign journalists were unexpectedly issued to cover the vote.

Results
The National League for Democracy (NLD) won 392 of the 492 contested seats, which would have given it an overwhelming majority in the constitutional committee had it convened. The National Unity Party (NUP), which was favoured by the incumbent military junta, came second in terms of vote share with 21% of the vote and fourth in terms of seats, with only 10 seats in the chamber. The remaining seats in the chamber were won by a mixture of ethnic parties and independents.

Aftermath
Initially, the SLORC said it would honour the results of the election. However, the government, surprised at the outcome, later annulled the results and many candidates were arrested or went into exile. Some later formed the National Coalition Government of the Union of Burma. Two months after the election, the SLORC issued Order 1/90, explaining it had legitimacy to rule as it was recognised by the United Nations and individual countries, as well as ensuring it would prevent the break-up of the Union. It required all parties to recognise and accept the Order, and many opposition figures who refused were arrested.

References

Myanmar
Elections in Myanmar
1990 in Myanmar
Annulled elections